Szymon Walków and Jan Zieliński were the defending champions but only Walków chose to defend his title, partnering David Pel. Walków successfully defended his title, defeating Neil Oberleitner and Philipp Oswald 7–5, 6–1 in the final.

Seeds

Draw

References

External links
 Main draw

Meerbusch Challenger - Doubles
2022 Doubles